San Pietro Piturno is a railway station in San Pietro Piturno, Italy. The station is located on the  Bari-Casamassima-Putignano railway. The train services are operated by Ferrovie del Sud Est.

Train services
The station is served by the following service(s):

Local services (Treno regionale) Bari - Casamassima - Putignano

References

This article is based upon a translation of the Italian language version as at May 2014.

Railway stations in Apulia
Buildings and structures in the Province of Bari